Tanzania Music Awards are national music awards held annually in Tanzania. They are also known as the Kilimanjaro Music Awards or the Kili Music Awards after their sponsor (Kilimanjaro Premium Lager). The awards were established in 1999 by the National Arts Council (BASATA) under the Tanzanian Ministry of Education and Culture.

Award categories 

List of 2022 awards:
 Song, Bongo Flava
 Artist, bongo flava (male)
 Entertainer, ⟨male⟩
 Entertainer, ⟨female⟩
 Artist, (male)
 Artist, emerging 
 Album
 Video
 Artist, people's choice
 Artist, people's choice (female)
 Artist, East Africa
 Artist, West Africa
 Artist, South Africa
 Collabo, African 
 Artist, singeli (male)
 Artist, singeli (female)
 Song, singeli
 Artist, reggae/dancehall
 Song, reggae/dancehall
 Artist, taarab
 Song, taarab
 Artist, hip-hop (male)
 Artist, hip-hop (female)
 Dancer
 Composer
 Composer, melody
 Director
 Producer, bongo flava
 Producer, singeli 
 Poducer, hip-hop

2010 winners

2011 winners

2012 winners

2013 winners

2022 winners

See also
Music of Tanzania

References

External links 
Tanzania Music Awards
2004 winners (Nominees)
Tanzania Music List Songs
2005 winners (Nominees)
2006 winners (Nominees)
2007 winners (Nominees)
2008 winners (Nominees)
2009 winners (Nominees)
(List of winners from the Tanzania Music Awards)

1999 establishments in Tanzania
African music awards
Awards established in 1999
Tanzanian music